William Cary Zucker (October 7, 1955 – September 19, 2016) was an American actor, comedian, writer, performer and musician.

Early life

William (Bill) Carey Zucker was born in Springfield, Massachusetts. From the age of nine, he began performing piano recitals in public, and soon started to score his own compositions. By age eleven, he had formed a garage band called "The Divided Line," in which he played the drums. He would jam regularly with the band until the age of fifteen, when he picked up his first guitar and wrote a song called "Show Me," about a break-up with his childhood sweetheart. Throughout high school Zucker would write guitar compositions. 

After high school, Zucker was accepted into the Berklee College of Music. After graduating from Berklee, he moved to Seattle for 3 years, so that he could attend Western Washington University. While there, he hosted his own campus radio show. 

After graduating Zucker became the front man for a country-rock band called "Colraine" and toured across America. Once the tour was over, he moved to Hollywood California.

Career
In Hollywood, Zucker teamed up with musician friend Ron Fair to write songs for Paramount Music.

Zucker then began working at NBC Studios as a production staff member for The Steve Allen Comedy Hour, a premier late night TV show. He then joined the writing team at the Barbara Mandrell Show.

Next Zucker formed the touring band "Cruise Control" that later evolved into "BZB" (The Bill Zucker Band).
The BZB featured Zucker on lead vocals and he would alternate between playing the guitar, drums, harmonica, fiddle and keyboard/synthesizer. Zucker wrote over 300 original songs for the "BZB.”

2000–2009
In early 2000 Zucker moved to Philadelphia to record a 12-song CD entitled Millennium. The music distributor that Zucker had thought would release Millennium though, did not follow up with him . As a result, Millennium was not internationally distributed. Zucker then moved to Miami Florida, and released the album independently. 

Zucker went on to record two albums, Stranded and Every Window, that he also independently released through his website.

While in Florida Zucker opened and ran several small businesses. Including a limousine rental company, and a nightclub in Miami called Z Street. Zucker regularly performed at Z Street.

Satirical Works
Zucker was severely affected by the 2008 Financial Crisis. After having invested heavily in the stock market, and real estate. The crash, and ensuing  bank bailout, inspired him to write and record The TARP Song. Criticising the too big to fail concept of banking. Zucker sent copies of The TARP Song music video to several news stations. It was shown in certain news segments on CNBC, FOX, VH1, MSNBC 

Zucker then wrote another comedy song satirising the use of social media called The Twitter Song. The music video featured clips submitted by Zucker’s fans, as well as video produced by Zucker himself.

Later Career and Death

Zucker wrote the first installment of The Kelsey Grammer Bill Zucker Comedy Hour  The first 3 episodes were broadcast on Kelseylive.com in early 2010. The show received poor reviews and no further episodes were made.

Zucker produced A Day with the Simmons family in which Zucker spent the day at the family home of KISS musician Gene Simmons and his partner Shannon Tweed.

Zucker filmed two parody episodes of Dog the Bounty Hunter entitled Dog the Bounty Hunter Hunts Bill Zucker, and Dog the TP hunter. Both released on Zucker’s YouTube channel.

In 2011 Zucker released music videos for some of his new songs: The Answer, Summer Girl, Friends, and Shannon, – the latter being a wedding present to his friends Gene Simmons and Shannon Tweed. He then recorded Rock and Roll Hair which featured Kelsey Grammer and Scott Baio.

In early 2012 Zucker moved to Hollywood from Miami, to concentrate on filming new television and film projects.

Also in 2012 Zucker released a new studio album called Half the Man EP. The video for the title track Half The Man starred the actress, presenter and playboy model, Jenny McCarthy as his love interest. This was Jenny McCarthy's first music video. 

Jenny McCarthy also appeared in another Bill Zucker video briefly as a woman who admits she is stalking Bill Zucker.

Bill Zucker appeared on episodes of Dog the Bounty Hunter, Gene Simmons Family Jewels, and Beverly Hills Pawn.

Bill Zucker's last television appearance was as a guest on The John Kerwin Show. Followed by a role in the movie "Beverly Hills Christmas" starring Dean Cain. Zucker died of a heart attack in the early morning of September 19th 2016, in his Hollywood apartment. He was 60 years old.

References

External links 
 http://www.facebook.com/mrbillzucker
 
 http://www.reverbnation.com/billzucker
 https://twitter.com/BillZucker

American male composers
American composers
Berklee College of Music alumni
Western Washington University alumni
1955 births
2016 deaths